Syndyas is a genus of flies belonging to the family Hybotidae.

The species of this genus are found in Europe, Asia, Africa and North America.

Species

Syndyas albipila Smith, 1969
Syndyas amazonica Ale-Rocha, 1999
Syndyas aterrima Meijere, 1913
Syndyas austropolita Teskey & Chillcott, 1977
Syndyas brevior Meijere, 1910
Syndyas crisis Jones, 1940
Syndyas dapana Frey, 1938
Syndyas dorsalis Loew, 1861
Syndyas elongata Meijere, 1910
Syndyas eumera Bezzi, 1904
Syndyas indumeni Smith, 1969
Syndyas jonesi (Smith, 1969)
Syndyas jovis (Jones, 1940)
Syndyas lamborni (Smith, 1969)
Syndyas lilani Smith, 1969
Syndyas lustricola Teskey & Chillcott, 1977
Syndyas melanderi Ale-Rocha, 2008
Syndyas merbleuensis Teskey & Chillcott, 1977
Syndyas merzi Shamshev & Grootaert, 2012
Syndyas minor Jones, 1940
Syndyas nigripes (Zetterstedt, 1842)
Syndyas nitida Loew, 1858
Syndyas opaca Loew, 1858
Syndyas orientalis Frey, 1938
Syndyas parvicellulata Bezzi, 1904
Syndyas pictipennis Jones, 1940
Syndyas pleuripolita Teskey & Chillcott, 1977
Syndyas polita Loew, 1861
Syndyas selinda Smith, 1969
Syndyas sinensis Yang & Yang, 1995
Syndyas sola Jones, 1940
Syndyas subsavinios Chvála, 1975
Syndyas tajikistanica Shamshev & Grootaert, 2012
Syndyas tomentosa Smith, 1969
Syndyas vitripennis (Brunetti, 1913)
Syndyas yunmengshanensis Yang, 2004

References

Hybotidae
Brachycera genera
Taxa named by Hermann Loew
Diptera of North America
Diptera of Africa
Diptera of Europe